Staroisayevo (İśke İsay) is a rural locality (a village) in Staroisayevsky Selsoviet, Nurimanovsky District, Bashkortostan, Russia. The population was 537 as of 2010. There are 5 streets.

Geography 
Staroisayevo is located 12 km south of Krasnaya Gorka (the district's administrative centre) by road. Starokulevo is the nearest rural locality.

References 

Rural localities in Nurimanovsky District